The 2009–10 Southeastern Conference men's basketball season began with practices on October 17, 2009, and ended with the Southeastern Conference (SEC) Tournament on March 11–14, 2010 at the Bridgestone Arena in Nashville.

Pre-season polls and teams
2009–10 SEC Men's Basketball Pre-Season Poll:

Pre-Season All-SEC Teams

SEC Coaches select 8 players
Players in bold are choices for SEC Player of the Year

Rankings

Conference tournament

Head coaches

Post season

NCAA tournament

National Invitation Tournament

Highlights and notes
2010 Big East/SEC Invitational

Players of the week
Throughout the conference regular season, the SEC offices named a player of the week each Monday.

Award Finalists Notes
Bob Cousy Award: The Naismith Memorial Basketball Hall of Fame in Springfield, Massachusetts, on Feb. 4, 2010 announced the final 11 candidates in consideration for the 2010 Bob Cousy Award presented by The Hartford Financial Services Group, Inc. This annual award is given to college basketball's top point guard and is named after Hall of Famer and former Boston Celtics guard Bob Cousy. An original list of 73 candidates made up of players from Division I, II and III schools was trimmed by a Hall of Fame appointed, nationally based committee to 20 and has now narrowed that list to a final 11. Devan Downey (South Carolina) and John Wall (Kentucky) were among the 11 finalists.
Oscar Robertson Trophy: Three SEC players were among the 16 announced finalists for the 2010 Oscar Robertson Trophy, to be presented to the U.S. Basketball Writers Association's national player of the year. Included among the SEC's candidates are: Kentucky's DeMarcus Cousins, South Carolina's Devan Downey and Kentucky's John Wall.

Awards and honors

All-Americans

All SEC teams and awards
The following individuals received postseason honors after having been chosen by the SEC coaches:

All-Academic

USBWA All-District team

References